Dame Julie Claire Molloy Christie  ( Molloy; born ) is a New Zealand businesswoman and television producer. She is the founder and former CEO of international television company Touchdown Productions, acquired by Dutch media company Eyeworks in 2006, and then later sold to Warner Bros.

Biography 
Christie was born in about 1962, and grew up in Greymouth. She is the sister of Leo Molloy. She moved to Wellington when she was 17 and started working in newspaper journalism.

After a decade as a sports sub-editor in newspapers, Christie moved into research for broadcaster Neil Roberts at Communicado production house. She started her own company, Touchdown Productions, in 1991.

Touchdown became a major exporter of television formats to 29 countries, most notably the gameshow The Chair for ABC in the US and the BBC, and the reality gameshow Treasure Island.

In the 2007 Queen's Birthday Honours, she was appointed an Officer of the New Zealand Order of Merit, for services to television, and in the  2017 Queen's Birthday Honours she was promoted to Dame Companion of the New Zealand Order of Merit, for services to governance and the television industry.

In 2021, Christie acquired a majority shareholding in the international natural history TV makers and documentary production company NHNZ, and changed the name to NHNZ Worldwide.  She is currently CEO.

Memberships 

 Rugby World Cup 2011 – Member of the Organising Board
 New Zealand Rugby Union – Member of the Commercial Committee 2012 to 2018
 New Zealand Trade and Enterprise – Board Member 2009 to 2015
 New Zealand Steering Group for World Expo Dubai 2020
 All Blacks Experience – Chair
 Development West Coast – Deputy Chair
 Rugby World Cup 2021 – Organising Committee Chair

References

Place of birth missing (living people)
Living people
New Zealand television producers
New Zealand businesspeople
Dames Companion of the New Zealand Order of Merit
People from Greymouth
1960s births